The 1898–99 Sheffield Shield season was the seventh season of the Sheffield Shield, the domestic first-class cricket competition of Australia. Victoria won the championship.

Table

Statistics

Most Runs
Clem Hill 502

Most Wickets
Hugh Trumble 34

References

Sheffield Shield
Sheffield Shield
Sheffield Shield seasons